"All for Love" is a song written by Bryan Adams, Robert John "Mutt" Lange, and Michael Kamen for the soundtrack  The Three Musketeers: Original Motion Picture Soundtrack. It is performed by Adams, Rod Stewart, and Sting. The power ballad was released as a CD single in the United States on November 16, 1993. It was a worldwide hit, reaching number one across Europe, in Australia and in North America.

Adams also did a live version in 1994 featuring Luciano Pavarotti, Andrea Bocelli, Nancy Gustafson, and Giorgia Todrani. Michael Kamen, who co-wrote the song with Adams, conducted the orchestra. In 2007, the Swedish band E.M.D. released a cover of the song, peaking at number one in their native country.

Background and writing
The title was inspired by The Three Musketeers' motto: "All for one, and one for all".

Critical reception
Alan Jones from Music Week rated "All for Love" five out of five. He wrote, "With the minimum of formalities Bryan, Rod and Sting launch into their-threeway rendilion of this powerful ballad from the movie The Three Musketeers. Their vocals blend well, and though the song itself is a trifle predictable, their combined fan base should be strong enough to send this hurtling into the Top Five in next to no time." Mark Frith from Smash Hits gave it four out of five, stating that it has "drama and powerful choruses on top. And it's got one of those searing guitar solos in the middle." He added, "Genius! Love or hate it, you can't deny the professionalism that will probably make this number 1."

Chart performance
In the United States, the single reached number one on the Billboard Hot 100 on January 22, 1994. It remained atop the charts for three weeks before it was knocked out of the top spot by "The Power of Love" by Celine Dion. It sold 1.2 million copies domestically and earned a platinum certification from the RIAA. In Canada, the song reached number one on the RPM Singles chart on January 17, 1994, replacing Adams's solo hit "Please Forgive Me", which had been number one for six weeks. With "All for Love" remaining at number one for five weeks, Adams was in the number one position for 11 straight weeks on the Canadian chart. In the United Kingdom, it reached number two on the UK Singles Chart. In 2007, the Swedish band E.M.D. released a cover of the song, peaking at number one in their native country.  Bryan Adams would also do a French-language remake with Garou and Roch Voisine, entitled Tous ensemble, for the Quebecois film Il était une fois Les Boys.

Personnel
 Bryan Adams – lead vocals
 Rod Stewart – lead vocals
 Sting – lead vocals, bass
 Dominic Miller – guitar
 Keith Scott – lead guitar
 Bill Payne – piano
 Ed Shearmur – keyboards
 Mickey Curry – drums

Charts

Weekly charts

Year-end charts

Decade-end charts

Certifications

E.M.D. version

On December 17, 2007, the Swedish trio E.M.D. released a cover of All for Love as their debut single. Debuting at number two in the official Swedish singles chart, it hit the top position the week after—eventually staying there for six consecutive weeks (the original version topped the chart for 10 weeks). The single stayed on the charts for 17 weeks, and was certified 3x Platinum in Sweden.

Track listing
 "All for Love (Album Version)" - 3:10

Chart positions

References

1990s ballads
1993 songs
1993 singles
2007 debut singles
A&M Records singles
Billboard Hot 100 number-one singles
Bryan Adams songs
Disney songs
E.M.D. songs
European Hot 100 Singles number-one singles
Irish Singles Chart number-one singles
Music videos directed by David Hogan
Number-one singles in Australia
Number-one singles in Austria
Number-one singles in Denmark
Number-one singles in Finland
Number-one singles in Germany
Number-one singles in Italy
Number-one singles in Norway
Number-one singles in Sweden
Number-one singles in Switzerland
Rock ballads
Rod Stewart songs
RPM Top Singles number-one singles
Songs written by Bryan Adams
Songs written by Michael Kamen
Songs written by Robert John "Mutt" Lange
Songs written for films
Songs about friendship
Sting (musician) songs